= Self-Censorship (film) =

2017 Taiwanese documentary film by Kevin H.J. Lee

- Directed by: Kevin H.J. Lee
- Release date: 2017
- Running time: 120 minutes
- Country: Taiwan
- Language: Mandarin

Self-Censorship (Chinese: 并：控制) is a 2017 Taiwanese documentary film directed by filmmaker Kevin H.J. Lee. It explores how Beijing limits freedom of expression in Hong Kong and Taiwan.
